The 2017 Virginia gubernatorial election was held on November 7, 2017. Incumbent Democratic Governor Terry McAuliffe was unable to run for reelection, as the Constitution of Virginia prohibits the officeholder from serving consecutive terms, although he later announced his campaign for a second term in the 2021 election.

Primary elections took place on June 13, 2017. Virginia utilizes an open primary, in which registered voters are allowed to vote in either party's primary election. The Democratic Party nominated Ralph Northam and the Republican Party nominated Ed Gillespie. The Libertarian Party nominated Clifford Hyra by convention on May 6, 2017.

In the general election on November 7, 2017, Democratic nominee Ralph Northam defeated Republican nominee Ed Gillespie, winning by the largest margin for a Democrat since 1985. Northam assumed office as the 73rd Governor of Virginia on January 13, 2018. The election had the highest voter turnout percentage in a Virginia gubernatorial election in twenty years, with over 47% of registered voters casting their ballot.

Democratic primary

Candidates

Nominee
 Ralph Northam, Lieutenant Governor of Virginia

Eliminated in primary
 Tom Perriello, former U.S. Representative

Declined
 Gerry Connolly, U.S. Representative
 Mark Herring, Attorney General of Virginia (running for re-election)
 Brian Moran, Virginia Secretary of Public Safety, former state delegate and candidate for governor in 2009

Endorsements

Polling

Results

Republican primary

Candidates

Nominee
 Ed Gillespie, former chairman of the Republican National Committee; nominee for the U.S. Senate in 2014

Eliminated in primary
 Corey Stewart, chairman of the Prince William Board of County Supervisors and candidate for lieutenant governor in 2013
 Frank Wagner, state senator

Failed to qualify
 Emmanuel Peter, bishop

Withdrew
 Denver Riggleman, businessman
 Rob Wittman, U.S. Representative

Declined
 Bill Bolling, former lieutenant governor of Virginia
 Eric Cantor, former Majority Leader of the United States House of Representatives
 Ken Cuccinelli, former Attorney General of Virginia; nominee for governor in 2013
 Randy Forbes, former U.S. Representative
 Tom Garrett Jr., U.S. Representative
 Shak Hill, financial consultant and candidate for the U.S. Senate in 2014
 Jeff McWaters, former state senator
 Mark Obenshain, state senator; nominee for attorney general in 2013
 Pete Snyder, technology executive and candidate for lieutenant governor in 2013

Endorsements

Polling

Results

Libertarian convention

Candidates

Nominee

 Cliff Hyra, attorney

Withdrawn
Jason Carrier

General election
The race had been closely watched by national observers. For Republicans, National Review wrote that Gillespie's campaign was an important example of whether and how mainstream Republican politics can produce victories in a purple state in the "era of Trumpism" and said that the outcome would affect Republican strategies in future races. Many Democrats believed that the election was a test of whether the party could find its way after losing the 2016 presidential election and several subsequent special elections. NBC News reported that Northam was the "hand-picked" choice of outgoing Governor Terry McAuliffe, and that McAuliffe's legacy and potential 2020 presidential aspirations depended on Northam winning the election.

Debates
After the primaries, Gillespie challenged Northam to ten debates, but only three were held. The first debate was hosted by the Virginia Bar Association on July 22 in Hot Springs, Virginia. The second was held on September 19, hosted by the Northern Virginia Chamber of Commerce in Tysons Corner, Virginia, and televised statewide by NBC-affiliated TV stations. The third and final debate was held on October 9 at University of Virginia's College at Wise in Wise, Virginia.

Endorsements

Predictions

Polling
Polls for the general election varied significantly, ranging from a 17-point lead for Ralph Northam on one end to an 8-point lead for Ed Gillespie on the other, with most polls showing the race within or close to the margin of error. Politico reported that the wide variation in polling numbers was likely due to differences in methodology among the polls. Polls tightened significantly in the last two weeks of the campaign with several showing the race tied or within the margin of error.
Aggregate polls

with Corey Stewart

with Frank Wagner

with Denver Riggleman

with Rob Wittman

with Ken Cuccinelli

with Eric Cantor

with Mark Herring

with Ralph Northam

Fundraising 

Virginia election laws allow for unlimited campaign contributions in state and local elections.

According to the Virginia Public Access Project, Northam's top five donors were the Democratic Governors Association's super PAC DGA Action; Michael Bloomberg's Everytown for Gun Safety group; the Virginia League of Conservation Voters; Michael D. Bills; and the Laborers' International Union of North America.

Gillespie's top five donors were the Republican Governors Association; A Stronger Virginia; Let's Grow Virginia; Marlene Ricketts; and Dwight Schar.

Hyra's top five donors were Michael Chastain; Hyra himself; the Libertarian Party of Virginia; Paradise Indian Restaurant; and nine donors who have given the same amount.

Results
Even though polls in the weeks before the election considered Northam to be the narrow favorite, Northam won by a larger margin than expected, about nine percent, and more than 200,000 votes. Gillespie was unable to come back from the large margins in the suburbs of Washington, D.C. and Virginia Beach, and he conceded to Northam at 8:56 pm EST. Northam's wider than expected margin of victory is often attributed to Trump's unpopularity in Virginia and claims that Gillespie was using fear-mongering which repelled more voters than it obtained.

Results by county and city

Results by congressional district

See also
 2017 United States gubernatorial elections
 Governors of Virginia
 2017 Virginia lieutenant gubernatorial election
 2017 Virginia Attorney General election
 2017 Virginia House of Delegates election

Notes

References

External links
Campaign websites (archived)
 Ed Gillespie
 Cliff Hyra
 Ralph Northam
 Tom Perriello
 Denver Riggleman
 Corey Stewart
 Frank Wagner

2017 United States gubernatorial elections
Gubernatorial
2017
November 2017 events in the United States